Nedim Doğan (born 1943 in İstanbul) was a Turkish football player of Fenerbahçe. He played as a forward. He started his professional career with İstanbulspor and then transferred to Fenerbahçe where he played twelve years between 1961-73. He scored 101 goals in 416 matches for Fenerbahçe SK. 

He played 9 matches for the national team.

References

External links
Profile @ TFF.org

1943 births
Turkish footballers
Turkey international footballers
Turkey under-21 international footballers
Turkey youth international footballers
Fenerbahçe S.K. footballers
Living people
Association football forwards